Novius virginalis is a species of lady beetle in the family Coccinellidae, formerly placed in the genus Anovia.

References

Coccinellidae
Articles created by Qbugbot
Beetles described in 1905